Pierre-Michel Germann (born March 5, 1985 in Nancy), known as Pierre Germann, is a French professional footballer. He currently plays for Championnat National 3 side La Roche VF as a midfielder.

He played on the professional level in Ligue 2 for Dijon FCO.

References
 
 Pierre Germann profile at foot-national.com
 

1985 births
Living people
Sportspeople from Nancy, France
French footballers
Association football midfielders
Ligue 2 players
Championnat National players
Championnat National 2 players
Championnat National 3 players
Dijon FCO players
SO Romorantin players
Nîmes Olympique players
AS Cherbourg Football players
Luçon FC players
Les Herbiers VF players
La Roche VF players
Footballers from Grand Est